Aliköy may refer to the following villages in Turkey:

 Aliköy, Azdavay
 Aliköy, Çaycuma